Secret of the Cave may refer to:

 Secret of the Cave (2006 film), a 2006 student film
 The Haunted House: The Secret of the Cave, a 2018 Korean animated film in The Haunted House by Tooniverse
 The Secret of the Caves, a 1929 book by Leslie McFarlane